Stansby is a surname, derived from places in England called Stainsby. Notable people with the surname include:

JoAnna Stansby, American bridge player
Lew Stansby (born 1940), American bridge player
William Stansby (1572–1638), English printer and publisher

English-language surnames
English toponymic surnames